Superboy-Prime (Clark Kent, born Kal-El), also known as Superman-Prime or simply Prime, is a DC Comics superhero turned supervillain and an alternate version of Superman. The character first appeared in DC Comics Presents #87 (November 1985) and was created by Elliot S. Maggin and Curt Swan (based upon the original Superboy character by Jerry Siegel and Joe Shuster).

Superboy-Prime is from a parallel Earth called Earth-Prime, devoid of any superheroes, or even superhumans. There, Superman and the other comic superheroes were fictional characters, as they are in real life. The Earth-Prime universe was erased during Crisis on Infinite Earths (April 1985-March 1986), and Superboy-Prime ended up in a "paradise" dimension where, during that time, he found himself unable to let go of his former life and destiny as Earth's greatest hero.

Over time, his convictions and morals become twisted and warped, and he came to believe that Earth-Prime was the only proper Earth and that Superboy-Prime was the only one worthy of the Superboy mantle. Prime firmly believes that being Superman is his calling despite the fact that he has become a psychotic, murderous, and even sadistic villain. His overwhelming strength, speed, unpredictability, and ruthlessness make him one of the most dangerous foes in the DC Universe.

The name "Superman-Prime" was first used by Grant Morrison in DC One Million (1998) for the mainstream Superman in the 853rd century (he is essentially the same Superman from the All-Star Superman storyline). Earth-Prime's Superboy first refers to himself as "Superboy-Prime" in Infinite Crisis #2 (January 2006).

Fictional character biography

Crisis on Infinite Earths

Superboy-Prime is from the universe known as Earth-Prime, in which the DC heroes are fictional comic book characters. He is the adopted son of Jerry and Naomi Kent. Naomi wanted to name their infant son Clark, after her maiden name, but Jerry, knowing he will also be named like Superman, a fictional comic book character, initially refused, but finally gave in. What the Kents do not know is that the baby, found abandoned in a forest, is actually a young Kal-El, who has been teleported to Earth by his father Jor-El moments before the planet Krypton was destroyed when its red sun went supernova. His parents were unable to escape that way due to a member of the Kryptonian council bursting into the room and using the device, although it is unknown what happened to him.

Young Clark lives the first fifteen years of his life as a normal boy. However, one night, as he attends a Halloween party dressed in a Superboy costume, the passage of Halley's Comet overhead triggers his Kryptonian powers. At the same time, the Earth-One Superman finds his way to Earth-Prime and the two Supermen meet. Superboy-Prime uses his powers to stop a tidal wave.

Superboy-Prime is drawn into the Crisis on Infinite Earths after his universe is consumed in the light of the Anti-Monitor. Although the loss of everything he knows causes him anguish, he finds peace in knowing that he fights the good fight alongside other heroes. During the final battle against the Anti-Monitor, Kal-L, the Earth-Two Superman, orders him to escape with Alexander Luthor, Jr. and the other heroes. Fearing that Kal-L will die in battle and knowing the new Earth is not his true home, Superboy-Prime joins Kal-L in the fight against the Anti-Monitor.

After the destruction of the Anti-Monitor by Kal-L, Superboy-Prime joins Alexander Luthor, Jr., of Earth-Three, Kal-L, and his wife Lois Lane in a "paradise dimension". In that dimension, Superboy-Prime secludes himself from the others, using crystals to replay events from his life on Earth-Prime. Superboy-Prime becomes frustrated and angry. He tries to reach out to Kal-L, whose attention is focused on Lois's failing health. Alexander comes to believe that the reason behind Lois's failing health is the paradise dimension itself, and he persuades Superboy-Prime to help him return to reality by showing Superboy-Prime the negative aspects of the post-Crisis Earth. Superboy-Prime hesitates until he overhears Kal-L say, "I wish this world would let him grow up. He'll never be Superman here". Finally, Alexander shows him the deaths of his parents and girlfriend in a car accident on the post-Crisis Earth.

Altering reality

Furious, Superboy-Prime pounded on the barrier of reality. This assault caused ripples that overlapped parallel timelines (Hypertime), which was used as an explanation for character changes, errors, and retcons in DC continuity. These changes included:

 The post-Crisis retcon of Jason Todd's origin and his resurrection.
 Superman's multiple origins, including The Man of Steel and Superman: Birthright, combining.
 The Doom Patrol's rebooting as new characters, including Elasti-Girl.
 Donna Troy's multiple origins after the first Crisis.
 Various incarnations of Hawkman.
 The different incarnations of the Legion of Super-Heroes since the first Crisis.

Countdown to Infinite Crisis
Eventually, Alexander reveals to Superboy-Prime that his powers are returning, and the two combine forces to break through the barrier wall. Together, they set into motion the events that culminate in Infinite Crisis:

 Alexander takes control of Batman's Brother Eye satellite, which allows him to control the OMACs and access Checkmate's files on Earth's metahumans, identifying which of them had origins in other realities.
 After rearranging countless other planets, Superboy-Prime pushes the planet Rann into Thanagar's orbit, destroying Thanagar's ecosystem, sparking the Rann-Thanagar War. His efforts shift the center of the universe away from Oa.
 Alexander poses as Lex Luthor and forms a new Secret Society of Super Villains, using them to kidnap various people from the former Earths to use as beacons to bring back other worlds.
 Alexander recruits the Psycho-Pirate to place Eclipso's Black Diamond in Jean Loring's cell at Arkham Asylum. As Eclipso, Loring seduces the Spectre and convinces him to destroy all magic. His actions create a raw form of magic that Alexander uses to power his tuning fork device, the Multiverse Tower.
 Superboy-Prime destroys the JLA Watchtower and abducts Martian Manhunter.

Infinite Crisis

The Superman of Earth-Two breaks open a portal to the DC Universe, and the four residents of the paradise dimension return, making themselves known to Power Girl and Batman. When introduced to Power Girl, he calls himself Superboy-Prime for the first time. Kal-L tells Power Girl: "When the universe was reborn, Earth-One became the primary world. The scraps of the remaining worlds were folded into it. But I finally realized—we saved the wrong Earth". Superboy-Prime is jealous of Conner Kent, the modern Superboy, believing him to be living the life he himself ought to have had while not fighting for it. He also believes the Earth's heroes act more like villains. Superboy-Prime confronts Superboy, telling him that he (Superboy-Prime) is the only Superboy the Earth needs. Superboy-Prime brutally attacks Conner, but not before Conner activates his Titans homing signal. The Teen Titans, the Doom Patrol, and the Justice Society of America arrive to help Conner. After accidentally killing Pantha with a deadly punch, Superboy-Prime is left shocked and horrified while the heroes try to contain Superboy-Prime, who kills (Wildebeest and Bushido) or wounds (tore Risk's arm off and badly beats most of the rest) several others.

Left with no other options, Jay Garrick, Wally West, and Bart Allen drive Superboy-Prime into the Speed Force, banish him to a parallel world and imprison him in a facility bathed in artificial red sunlight, where he remains for four years.

Hours later, an older Bart Allen, dressed in his grandfather's costume, emerges from the Speed Force and tells the heroine Doctor Light to warn the other heroes that Superboy-Prime has escaped. During a battle between Alexander Luthor and the heroes freed from his tower, Superboy-Prime appears, wearing a power suit modeled after the Anti-Monitor's armor, which constantly feeds him yellow solar energy and boosts his power levels. During the battle, Black Adam discovers that magic has little effect against Superboy-Prime. Superboy-Prime knocks Adam away from the tower, and his opponent is transported to Earth-S. Superboy-Prime insists that Luthor reinstate Earth Prime as the only existing Earth. After Superboy-Prime attempts to kill Wonder Girl (Cassie Sandsmark), an enraged Conner Kent attacks him. Conner and Superboy-Prime's battle sends them both headlong into Alexander Luthor's vibrational tuning fork with the effects causing the machine to explode and resulting in the alternate Earths merging into one. Conner dies from injuries sustained during the explosion, leaving the rest of the superheroes devastated.

Alexander and Superboy-Prime join the Battle of Metropolis and quarrel about their contingency plan. Since their tower has been destroyed, Alexander is prepared to settle for taking over New Earth instead of creating a perfect Earth. Upon hearing of the new plan, Superboy-Prime refuses to help him, as he believes New Earth to be hopelessly inferior.

When Batman, Wonder Woman, Kal-El, and Kal-L arrive to save Metropolis, Kal-L confronts Alex about his role in the destruction. Meanwhile, Superboy-Prime is attacked by Bart Allen, who has been left outraged by Conner's death. Superboy-Prime escapes Bart and flies toward the planet Oa, intending to destroy it and spark another Big Bang which would recreate the universe with himself as the sole hero. Although the majority of the Earth's heroes are in pursuit, Superboy-Prime eludes capture.

Breaking through, he battles 32 Green Lanterns, killing them. The two Supermen arrive and fly Superboy-Prime through Rao, the red sun of Krypton. The heat melts away Superboy-Prime's armor and severely weakens all three Kryptonians, who then crash on Mogo. Superboy-Prime beats Kal-L to death, but is then attacked by Kal-El. Superboy-Prime claims that he is better than Kal-El and that his Krypton was superior to Kal-El's. Kal-El responds, "It's not about where you were born. Or what powers you have. Or what you wear on your chest. It's about what you do... It's about action." Although nearly powerless, Kal-El knocks Superboy-Prime out before collapsing himself, but members of the Green Lantern Corps manage to save Kal-El.

Superboy-Prime is taken into the custody of the Guardians of the Universe, who place him in a quantum containment field, surrounded by a red Sun-Eater and guarded by 50 Green Lanterns. While inside his cell, he carves the Superman symbol into his chest, vowing to escape.

Sinestro Corps

A year later, Superboy-Prime sits naked in his cell and is watched over by a special cadre of Green Lanterns, including Guy Gardner, when the Guardians of the Universe discuss whether they should question him.

When the Sinestro Corps attack Oa, Superboy-Prime is released from his imprisonment and joins them. He becomes one of the Anti-Monitor's heralds, and he wears the uniform of the Sinestro Corps along with a variant of the power suit he wore during Infinite Crisis. Calling himself Superman-Prime (in part due to the legal disputes over the Superboy name), he arrives on Earth and battles a large group of heroes while flashing back on his life so far. He reveals that he did not believe Sinestro when he said that the Multiverse has been restored, and has only gone along with the Anti-Monitor's plans so that he may one day get revenge on him for the destruction of Earth Prime. Superman, Power Girl, and Supergirl arrive and stop him, only to have him escape as the sun rises, restoring his powers. Afterwards, Superman-Prime brutally battles Ion (Sodam Yat) throughout the state of New York. Superman-Prime gets the upper hand over Yat by exposing him to lead, and defeats him. When the Anti-Monitor is wounded by the Guardians and the destruction of War World, Superman-Prime impatiently flies through his chest and throws him into space, then battles both the Sinestro Corps and Green Lantern Corps, until a Guardian willingly sacrifices himself to destroy Superman-Prime. However, instead of dying, Prime is infused with Oan energy and warped back into the multiverse.

Countdown to Final Crisis

In Countdown to Final Crisis, following the conclusion of the Sinestro Corps War, Superman-Prime is shown wearing a costume similar to the black suit worn by Superman shortly after his resurrection and has discovered the existence of the new Multiverse, traversing it in the hopes of finding Earth Prime. He arrives on Earth-15 and attacks that world's Lex Luthor, blaming him for Alexander Luthor's failure to make the universe "perfect". He promptly kills that world's heroes and destroys the planet.

He then flies to his new base of operations in the Source Wall where he had been torturing Mister Mxyzptlk into helping him recreate Earth Prime. It is revealed that Superman-Prime is 19 years old. According to Mxyzptlk, his growth is the temporary side effect of his cells absorbing vast Oan energy from his last "encounter". Mxyzptlk escapes with the help of another prisoner, Annataz Arataz, an alternate version of Zatanna from Earth-3. Annataz is killed when Superman-Prime grows angry and gives up on using magic to achieve his goals.

He appears on the Monitors' satellite headquarters and threatens Solomon to help him find Earth Prime. Solomon tells him that if he releases Forerunner, he will show Prime what he wants; Prime does so. Solomon then tells Prime that Earth-51 is his perfect Earth, and it is in ruins due to the fighting between Monarch's Army, the Earth-51 heroes, and the Challengers. Prime leaves the satellite, intending to confront Monarch. Superman-Prime fights with Monarch, finding out that this is an enemy who is on his level despite his boosted powers from the Guardian. The two seem evenly matched until Prime becomes slightly injured after Monarch exposes part of his suit and releases some of his massive contained energies. In a fit of rage, Superman-Prime redoubles his attack on Monarch and rips open the chestplate of Monarch's containment armor, resulting in a huge explosion of quantum energy that seems to destroy the entire universe of Earth-51.

Legion of 3 Worlds

Shortly after the events of Geoff Johns' Superman and the Legion of Super-Heroes storyline, the Time Trapper finds Superboy-Prime lost in time. He decides to use him to destroy the Legion and sends him to the 31st century, where he crashes in a farm outside of Smallville.

He appears much younger than he did when he was last seen in Countdown to Final Crisis, having used up the power he had absorbed from the dying Guardian. He encounters the elderly couple who own the farm, and they refer to him as Superboy, which enrages him. After being shot, he kills the farming couple, makes his way into Smallville, and visits the Superman Museum, where he discovers that he is regarded as merely a footnote in Superman's history, and ultimately has no impact on history. This sends him into a tantrum, in which he wrecks the museum and kills security guards and police officers. In the middle of his tantrum, the museum tour guide (a holographic recreation of Jimmy Olsen) tells Prime of the Legion of Super-Villains.

He learns that the evil Legion followed a code of evil, inspired by a dark being whose "name was never spoken". Prime, resolved to be a villain with more of an impact than any other enemy of Superman, sets out for the prison planet of Takron-Galtos, and frees Lightning Lord, Saturn Queen, and Cosmic King. Unlike most denizens of the 31st century, they all recognize Prime and seem overjoyed to see him. The dialogue seems to imply that Prime was the dark being whose example the villains follow.

After freeing the prisoners, Prime burns a huge S shield into the prison planet, determined to turn the shield from a symbol of hope into a symbol of terror. Learning of the prison break, the Legion of Super-Heroes call Superman from the 21st century. Superman, and the historical records, implies that no one from New Earth is aware of what happened to Prime after the Sinestro Corps War.

Superman and Brainiac 5 decide to bring in two other versions of the Legion to combat Prime and the new Legion of Super-Villains, with Superman convinced the only way to neutralize the threat of Prime is to redeem him.

Superboy-Prime led his Legion of Super-Villains to Sorcerer's World, where he recruits Mordru and kills Rond Vidar (the last Green Lantern) before heading to Earth.

During the war between the Legions of Super-Heroes and the Legion of Super-Villains, Prime battles several opponents with whom he has a history. First, the immortal Sodam Yat (the last Guardian of the Universe) is persuaded to end his self-imposed retirement on Oa to battle Superboy-Prime. Then Bart Allen returns from the Speed Force, wearing the Kid Flash uniform that he had not worn since fighting Prime in Infinite Crisis. Soon after, Conner Kent (Superboy) enters the battle, his corpse dug up by Starman in the present and placed in a Kryptonian restoration chamber for the past 1000 years. The resurrections of Kid Flash and Superboy are part of a master contingency plan devised long before by Brainiac 5, who was forewarned of Superboy-Prime by one of Dream Girl's prophecies.

During the battle, Prime kills two Legionnaires whose abilities manage to hurt him: Sun Boy of Earth Prime's "Threeboot Legion", who uses red solar powers; and Element Lad of Earth Prime, who managed to turn the ground around Prime into green kryptonite of the Earth Prime universe.

During the battle, Superman, Lightning Lad, Cosmic Boy, and Saturn Girl are brought to the end of time by the Time Trapper, who then attacks them. During the fight, the Trapper is revealed to be an aged Superboy-Prime. The elder Superboy-Prime states that he became an anomaly that could not be killed after being shunted into the multiverse by the Guardians of the Universe and became the sole survivor of all creation. 

Back on Earth, Conner quickly begins gaining the upper-hand against Prime. Using his heat-vision, Conner manages to create a deep wound across the S-shield that Prime had carved into his chest. Meanwhile, at the end of time, the same wound appears on Time Trapper's chest. Realizing that Time Trapper's past is directly connected to his future, Saturn Girl uses the Time Trapper's time portals to recruit every Legion across the multiverse, who fight and defeat the Time Trapper. Superman and the three Legion founders transport him to the 31st Century, where the Trapper faces his younger self. Superboy-Prime and Trapper start bickering which culminates with their mutual destruction after Prime attacks Time Trapper, creating a paradox.

The paradox created by Prime attacking himself returns him to Earth-Prime. To his dismay, his girlfriend and family have read Infinite Crisis, Sinestro Corps War, Countdown to Final Crisis, and Legion of 3 Worlds, and are now terrified of him. Prime lives in his parents' basement, who support him out of fear for what he might do to them. He spends his days collecting comic books and trolling the DC Comics message boards, remarking that the DCU will never be rid of him and that he "always survives." Despite the physical depletion of his powers, his eyes begin glowing red again.

Blackest Night

Superboy-Prime continues to live his secluded life, unknowingly but constantly monitored by the prime universe Brainiac 5, still compulsively reading every comic book and message board post pertaining to the DC multiverse. The extended cool-off period forced on him has left Clark more regretful, aware of his reputation as a joke character in the eyes of the people of Earth-Prime. Upon reading Adventure Comics #4, and the online solicitations for the two-part storyline possibly dealing with his death, he embarks with his fearful parents on a wild goose chase, hoping to find a comic book store willing to sell him a copy of the fifth issue. However, since the fifth issue is not yet on the shelves, the events unfold exactly as Clark already read them, with Alexander Luthor, multiversal-hopping Black Lantern, bestowing to him all of his powers in order to bring him to a higher emotional state. Upon calling forth Superboy's victims, he teasingly reveals to him his impending death in Adventure Comics #5. Unable to damage the Black Lanterns, Superboy-Prime flies to the DC Comics building in New York and attempts to take revenge on the writers he believes made him the way he is. Before he can do so, Alexander teleports him to his basement, and begins destroying his comic collection.

Superboy-Prime then accepts the hopelessness of his situation, and willingly puts on a black ring, which wills him to "die". However, the ring, reacting to his mixed emotions, switches between the powers of the emotional spectrum, resulting in a mixed-light burst that eradicates the Black Lanterns and the ring itself. Lying on the floor, he becomes overcome by the emotions forced by the ring and devastated that "they" have turned him into a monster and made it so he cannot ever have a "happy ending." Laurie enters the basement, sporting a broken arm. She comforts Prime, telling him that "they" heard him, and that they sent her to tell him that they are sorry for what they did to him, and are going to leave him alone—"they" previously mentioned as being the writers at DC Comics. As they embrace, a Black Lantern ring is shown on Laurie's hand that detects the hope within Prime's heart.

Legion of Doom
During a battle with the Teen Titans, a young villain named Headcase opens up a wormhole that accidentally transports Superboy-Prime back to New Earth. Enraged by his separation from Laurie, Superboy-Prime vows to destroy the Teen Titans and find a possible way to return home. He subsequently assembles a cadre of young supervillains consisting of Headcase, Zookeeper, Indigo, Sun Girl, Persuader (Elise Kimble) and a new Inertia, each of whom have a personal grudge against the Teen Titans. Superboy-Prime also brings three clones of Superboy (formed from the remains of Match), and he uses them to assist in the attack on the Titans. Superboy-Prime and his team attempt to destroy Titans Tower, but are met by the large group of former Teen Titans. Superboy-Prime is brought down by the combined might of the reserve Teen Titans, and then Superboy and Supergirl imprison him within the Source Wall. What becomes of him following the paradox and subsequent reboot of the multiverse caused by Barry Allen is left unknown

DC Rebirth
In the 2016 initiative DC Rebirth, Doctor Sivana and Mister Mind head to the Monsterlands' Dungeon of Eternity to free the Monster Society of Evil. As King Kid fights the Shazam Family, Doctor Sivana and Mister Mind find that Superboy-Prime is trapped inside a small prison cell when he states to Mister Mind that he can hear what the villain is saying. Superboy-Prime even states that he has plans for Billy Batson when he gets out. After Mister Mind has Doctor Sivana stab his magic eye with a magic dagger, Superboy-Prime senses that the Monster Society of Evil are being freed, demanding that Mister Mind releases him as well. When Dummy arrives, displeased that he was left behind after swimming all the way to the Dungeon of Eternity, Superboy-Prime states to Dummy that he can get him out in exchange for removing the little red sun outside of his prison. Dummy does so and is double-crossed by Superboy-Prime, who uses his heat beams on Dummy. Superboy-Prime then begins his plans to go after Billy Batson. As a Mister Mind-controlled C.C. Batson has Shazam cast the spell to unite the Seven Magiclands, Superboy-Prime is shown wandering the Monsterlands, asking the readers if they know how to get out. Superboy-Prime crashes the fight between the Shazam Family and the Monster Society of Evil, using his fists to impale Scapegoat. Shazam punches Mister Mind's talkbox enough to emit magical energy that knocks out the Monster Society of Evil, which Superboy-Prime also feels. When Shazam starts to work to undo Mister Mind's spell, Superboy-Prime interferes and defeats the Shazam Family until only Shazam remains standing. Free of the spell that affected him, Black Adam joins the fight and asks for Shazam to cast the spell while he buys him some time. As magic can still hurt Superboy-Prime, both Shazam and Black Adam shout "Shazam", causing lightning strikes to knock out Superboy-Prime. Superboy-Prime is handed over to the Justice League, as the Shazam Family don't know what else to do with him.

Dark Knights: Death Metal
In the pages of Dark Nights: Death Metal, Superman, Batman and Wonder Woman travel back to the times of the three great crises to stop Perpetua's attempts to manipulate those events. Wonder Woman encounters a victorious Superboy-Prime in an alternate version of Infinite Crisis. He taunts Wonder Woman that Perpetua has already changed the outcome of these events. Prime has created his perfect universe based on the comic books of his youth, reasoning that it is the only way to preserve good in Perpetua's new multiverse, notably he has created a Superman to protect this world rather than act as Superman himself.<ref>Dark Nights: Death Metal: Trinity Crisis #1. DC Comics.</ref> Although the Anti-Monitor and Darkseid nearly unmake Batman and Superman in the other Crises, Wonder Woman is able to talk with Superboy-Prime about his resentment of the heroes for becoming darker than he remembers from his childhood, imploring him to accept that change is constant, and that in the end there's room for all universes. Superboy-Prime shatters the Crisis worlds (saving Batman and Superman in the process) and directs all energy to Wally West. His change proves apparently pointless as the Darkest Knight had already rigged the Mobius Chair so it would always direct the power to himself, allowing him to remake the Multiverse in his own image.

Prime awaits the final battle with the Darkest Knight's "Last 52" multiverse alongside the other heroes and villains. He stands alone on the battlefield, rejected by the Superman Family and their rogues gallery, and reflects on his life and the loss of everyone and everything he cared about, and how he was never able to be a hero. Depressed and nihilistic after the multiple cosmic reboots and retcons he has witnessed, he hurls himself into the fight with an army of alternate Supermen. As he strikes one, he has a vision of that Superman's world changing to reflect Superboy-Prime's own desires. Realising that he is able to tap into Darkest Knight's energy and once again possesses the ability to reshape reality with his blows, he flies away from the battle to confront the Darkest Knight. He proves equal to the Darkest Knight, despite the other's immense power. Superboy-Prime plans to steal Darkest Knight's power, destroy what remains of reality and the people who hate him, and create his own perfect world. However, the arrival of Krypto, the only one who showed him any kindness, causes him to stay his hand. The Darkest Knight offers him a world of his own, where he can be the beloved and accepted hero he always wanted to be alongside the characters he loved as a child, if he joins the Darkest Knight's forces. Prime rejects him, and strikes the Darkest Knight with all his power, creating a massive explosion, killing him and injuring the Darkest Knight. He falls from the sky dead as some of the Last 52 worlds vanish, his sacrifice unnoticed by anyone but Krypto. Clark suddenly finds himself in his bedroom, reading Dark Knights: Death Metal: The Secret Origin #1, looking at his own dead body on the page. Laurie arrives to ask him out to lunch. As they walk down the street, Clark realises that although the world has changed from what he remembers, he knows he is really home. A child chases a ball into the street into the path of a car, Clark runs in after them and lifts the car above his head.

Powers and abilities
Kryptonian powers
Superboy-Prime has all the basic abilities of a Kryptonian except at a much higher level when compared to most adult Kryptonians, especially Superman, with exposure to yellow sunlight: superhuman strength, speed, senses, healing, endurance, superbreath, frost breath, flight, X-ray vision, telescopic vision, microscopic vision, heat vision, and invulnerability.

Power suit
While imprisoned by the Flashes in the speed force (where the Flash draws his power from), Superboy-Prime builds a power suit based on the one worn by the Anti-Monitor. The suit collects and feeds him yellow solar energy to maintain his power levels even when exposed to a red sun; in his first appearance, he was shown to shrug off the effects of artificial, localized red sun radiation, but he was not exposed to an actual red sun. Although he claims to have made it himself, Bart Allen remembers him stealing it following his escape. It is destroyed when the two Supermen fly Superboy-Prime through Krypton's red sun. After his escape from Oa, Superboy-Prime is given a new power suit built by the Sinestro Corps and reveals that he created the original after seeing how the Anti-Monitor's armor acted as a giant energy collector. It was destroyed during the assault on Earth. In Legion of 3 Worlds, Superboy-Prime dons his original armor once more, taking it from a statue in the Superman museum. During the Blackest Night, the Black Lantern Alexander Luthor provides Superboy-Prime with a copy of his original armor. It was ripped off by the aforementioned Black Lanterns.

Weaknesses
Whereas most versions of Superman have a weakness to magic, Superboy-Prime has a greater resistance to it; he was able to easily fight off Black Adam during their initial encounter, and was only defeated by Shazam and Black Adam in the DC Rebirth when both of them attacked him by saying their word simultaneously, striking him with far more magical force than even he could cope with. Additionally, most versions are affected by kryptonite; however, kryptonite from one universe does not affect Kryptonians from other universes. The Krypton of Earth Prime's universe—unlike other versions of the planet—was completely absorbed by its sun, rather than being destroyed and ejecting fragments from the explosion which would have created kryptonite, so, for some time, it seemed that no kryptonite that could affect Superboy-Prime existed. During his battles with the three Legions, however, the "Threeboot" Element Lad is able to transmute the ground around Superboy-Prime into a form of kryptonite that does hurt him. It is revealed that threeboot Element Lad is from Earth-Prime's future.

Superboy-Prime loses his powers when exposed to a red sun, as do other versions of Superman. In his first appearance, he is shown to resist the effects of red sun radiation; however, this radiation was artificial. Every time Prime has been depowered, it has taken an actual red sun, and not merely localized red sun radiation. Kal-El and Kal-L defeat Superboy-Prime by flying him directly through Krypton's red sun Rao, destroying his armor and diminishing their powers in the process. Afterward, the Green Lantern Corps imprison him inside a "junior" Red Sun-Eater, which similarly depowers him. Also, unlike most versions of Superman who can store yellow solar energy to extend the use of their powers, Prime requires constant exposure to yellow sunlight to maintain his; otherwise, he will depower almost instantly.

His reaction to psionics has not been fully explored, although Martian Manhunter is shown to be able to read his mind. Saturn Girl's attempts to attack him psionically seem to have little effect. When Nightshade attacks Superboy-Prime with darkness, he shows a deep achluophobia brought about most likely from the darkness blocking his access to yellow sunlight.

Superboy-Prime has a fear of the Flash Family, due in large part to them pushing Superboy-Prime into the Speed Force, where they imprison him under red sunlight to depower him for several years until he breaks out. He reveals his continued fear of them when, during the Sinestro Corps War, he is confronted by Wally West and Jay Garrick, admitting with a stutter "I d-don't like Speedsters!" This fear is again on display in Legion of 3 Worlds, when he lapses into a fearful stutter while recounting his battle with the Flashes during Infinite Crisis. Upon learning of the Legion's attempts to bring Bart back, Prime goes into a panic, going so far as to fly through his own Legion's forces as to attempt to stop Bart from returning; yelling and stuttering, even whimpering to himself in fear as he does so. Upon realizing that he is too late, Prime even screams in fear upon seeing the returned Kid Flash racing towards him.

Massive amounts of quantum energy have been shown to injure Superboy-Prime as well, as seen in his battle with Monarch.

Personality
According to Infinite Crisis writer Geoff Johns, "Superboy-Prime's really frustrated with what his life has turned into and, unfortunately, that frustration is going to be taken out on the world". He also mentioned that "He's been wanting to show the world what he can do, because he barely had a chance to be Superboy. He was Superboy a little bit before Crisis on Infinite Earths and then—BOOM!—his world was wiped out and that was it".

After the publication of Infinite Crisis #5, Johns said at the Wizard World LA convention: "That took me a long time to break, because I thought Superboy-Prime needed to view the world so narrow. You can see how his world view is so narrow and so black and white and realistically that is not going to work anymore". Originally, Superboy-Prime started out coming into Crisis as corrupted and evil, but the take on the character did not work for Johns. "I said to Dan I think Prime does it by accident and is horrified. That panel where's he is looking at his hands and goes 'I didn't mean to do it', that for me is the entire story for Superboy-Prime. He didn't mean to do this stuff. What is worse... making a mistake and fessing up to it or doing something bad and saying 'You made me do it?'. Superboy-Prime is a very simplistic character who has become very complex".

When asked if Superboy-Prime was irredeemable or not, Johns replied "I think it's a split. You saw his reaction when he did what he did in Infinite Crisis, but at that same time, he's walked over that line. Does he think he can walk back? Should he? Does this universe even matter to him anymore? Is it the fact that now that he's got a big dent on his car, another one won't matter? If he's already on that path, is he going to continue on it, or is he going to really try and work and go back?"

Alternate versions
In Dark Multiverse: Infinite Crisis, after Ted Kord takes over Checkmate when he kills Maxwell Lord, he manages to subvert most of Alexander Luthor's plans before confronting Luthor and Prime directly. After Alexander Luthor confirms Ted's belief that he has been manipulating events and denounces Prime as an idiot he manipulated into helping him, Luthor kills the Earth-2 Superman and Lois when he tries to kill Prime with a specially designed kryptonite weapon, only for Prime to kill him. Kord convinces Prime to act as his enforcer as he tries to establish himself as Earth's new discreet 'ruler', using Brother Eye's insight to track and eliminate metahuman threats, but when Prime defies his orders to bring in the Teen Titans unharmed, Kord infects Prime with the OMAC nanites to turn him into part of Kord's new OMAC enforcers.

See also
 Superman: Secret Identity
 List of Superman enemies
 Ultraa
 Alternate versions of Superman
 Multiverse (DC Comics)
 Brightburn'', a 2019 superhero horror film with a similar topic

References

External links

 .
 .

Alternative versions of Superman
Characters created by Curt Swan
Comics characters introduced in 1985
DC Comics characters who can move at superhuman speeds
DC Comics characters with accelerated healing
DC Comics characters with superhuman senses
DC Comics characters with superhuman strength
DC Comics extraterrestrial superheroes
DC Comics extraterrestrial supervillains
DC Comics male superheroes
DC Comics male supervillains
DC Comics orphans
Fictional characters displaced in time
Fictional characters from parallel universes
Fictional characters with slowed ageing
Fictional characters with X-ray vision
Fictional characters with superhuman durability or invulnerability
Fictional characters with nuclear or radiation abilities
Fictional characters with air or wind abilities
Fictional characters with ice or cold abilities
Fictional characters with absorption or parasitic abilities
Fictional characters with energy-manipulation abilities
Fictional characters with fire or heat abilities
Fictional characters with psychiatric disorders
Fictional mass murderers
Fictional sole survivors
Fictional torturers
Infinite Crisis
Kryptonians
Superboy
Superman characters